The 1961 Campeonato Ecuatoriano de Fútbol was the 3rd national championship for football teams in Ecuador. Emelec won their second national title.

Qualified teams

Standings

Results

Top goalscorers

References

Ecuadorian Serie A seasons
1961 in Ecuadorian sport
Ecu